Ojukokoro: Greed, also known simply as Ojukokoro, is a 2016 Nigerian crime-heist comedy film starring an ensemble cast, which consists of Wale Ojo, Tope Tedela, Charles Etubiebi, Seun Ajayi, Shawn Faqua, Ali Nuhu, Somkele Iyamah, Emmanuel Ikubese and Afeez Oyetoro. It was written and directed by Dare Olaitan and produced by Olufemi D. Ogunsanwo.

Olaitan wrote Ojukokoro in 2014 and it was his first complete screen-play. The film is ordered in chapters and considerable screen time is devoted to exploring the motivations of the diverse cast with an ironic combination of humor and strong violence. The film was released on 17 March 2017 to a positive critical reception.

Plot
"Ojukokoro unwraps an intriguing tale about a money-strapped manager of a shady Petrol Station who decides to rob his employers, but along the line, finds out in a sudden twist that he is not alone in his ambition and that a good reason isn’t always a right one."

Cast
Tope Tedela as Sunday
Charles Etubiebi as Manager
Wale Ojo as Mad Dog Max
Seun Ajayi as Monday
Ali Nuhu as Jubril
Shawn Faqua as Rambo
Somkele Iyamah as Sade
Afeez Oyetoro (Saka)
Emmanuel Ikubese as The Accountant
Sammie Eddie as DJ
Gbolahan Olatunde
Kayode Olaiya (Aderupoko)
Linda Ejiofor
Kunle Remi
Zainab Balogun

Production
Principal Photography began in April 2016. A teaser trailer for the film was released in October 2016. In January 2017, a full length trailer was released for the film.

Release
Ojukokoro was released in Nigerian Cinemas on 17 March 2017.

Ojukokoro screened at the Metrograph in New York in April from the 13–15 April 2018.

Ojukokoro debuted on Netflix streaming services (USA) in April 2021.

References

External links
 
 Official Instagram

Nigerian comedy films
Nigerian thriller films
Films set in Lagos
Films shot in Lagos
2016 films
Nigerian crime comedy films